John B. Lis (May 28, 1915 – March 20, 1985) was an American politician who served in the New York State Assembly from 1954 to 1972.

He died of cancer on March 20, 1985, in Buffalo, New York at age 69.

References

1915 births
1985 deaths
Democratic Party members of the New York State Assembly
20th-century American politicians